Wray is a small village in Lancashire, England, part of the civil parish of Wray-with-Botton, in the City of Lancaster district. Wray is the point at which the River Roeburn joins the River Hindburn.

Demographics
According to the 2001 census Wray-with-Botton had 521 residents,  269 male, 252 female and 200 homes.

Facilities
The village has a general store with a post office. The village also has a pub, The George and Dragon; a tearoom, Bridge House Farm Tearooms; and the Bridge House Bistro.

Wray has a wireless broadband network maintained by Lancaster University with a wireless mesh network. The village is also working with the university to trial a digital TV network through the mesh.

Wray is the Scarecrow village of Lancashire and has a website one of the earliest villages to so. Wray is home to the "maggot races", an annual event which raises money for local charities.

History

1967 Wray Flood

A flash flood on 8 August 1967 of the river Roeburn resulted in the loss of houses, bridges, livestock, vehicles, and personal possessions. Despite the scale of the devastation, no serious injury was done to any residents. The flood is illustrated in the Millennium Mosaic, completed in September 2000, which represents the wind and storm spewing out a great tide of water. The mosaic is in the 'Flood Garden' on Main Street, the site of some of the houses demolished by the flood. Photos of the flood are village website and  displayed the post office.

Railway
Wray railway station was between Hornby and Wennington on the "little" North Western Railway. It opened in 1849 and closed six months later.

Scarecrow Festival

The Scarecrow Festival, established 1995, takes place every year during the week leading up to May Day when there is a fair. During the week there are refreshments served daily in the village hall and a parade of the giants. Many villagers erect scarecrows outside their homes, and these are all photographed and added to the digital noticeboard online via the village website. On Easter Monday 2011, the festival's cricket match, Twicket, was live-streamed on the internet.

See also
Holy Trinity Church, Wray

References

External links

 Virtual Tour of the Village with panoramas and hundreds of photos, plus video history of the Scarecrow Festival and Wray Fair.
 Wray Methodist Church

Villages in Lancashire
Geography of the City of Lancaster
Forest of Bowland